Glendower Prep School is an independent preparatory school in South Kensington, London for girls aged 4 to 11.

History
Glendower Prep was founded in 1895 by Miss Lloyd and Miss Cornwall at 103A Fulham Road and was originally called "Cornwall and Lloyd School". The school shared premises with Dunn and Co the hatters and The Sports Motor Car Co.

At some point between 1902 and 1918, the school moved to 5 Glendower Road and changed its name to Glendower School. After 2 years in Glendower Road, the school relocated to 25 - 27 Cromwell Road.

The school remained at this site from 1920 until 1939 when the Second World War forced an evacuation to Cornwall. Glendower moved into 87 Queen's Gate in 1947 where it has remained with some extension and expansion until the present day.

 the headmistress is Ms Kingsmill Moore.
From 2012-2019, the headmistress was Ms Sarah Knollys.

Etymology
The name Glendower itself is an anglicised pronunciation of the Welsh prince's name Owain Glyndŵr.

Notable former pupils

Gayatri Devi of Jaipur
Patricia Ford
Carmen Ejogo
Koo Stark
Harper Beckham

References

External links
School Website
Profile on the ISC website

Educational institutions established in 1895
1895 establishments in England
Private schools in the Royal Borough of Kensington and Chelsea
Private girls' schools in London
Preparatory schools in London